Lake Herbert G. West (or Lake West) is a reservoir formed by the Lower Monumental Dam in the U.S. state of Washington. It extends up the Snake River for 28 miles (45 km) to the tailwater of Little Goose Dam.

As the reservoir filled in 1968, it flooded several archaeological sites, including the Marmes Rockshelter, which contained the oldest known artifacts in Washington, dating back over 10,000 years.

The lake was named for Herbert G. West, a major promoter of inland navigation on the Columbia and Snake rivers.

References

External links
Lower Monumental Dam and Lake Herbert G. West U.S. Army Corps of Engineers

West, Herbert G.
Snake River
Bodies of water of Columbia County, Washington
Bodies of water of Franklin County, Washington
Bodies of water of Walla Walla County, Washington
Bodies of water of Whitman County, Washington
1968 establishments in Washington (state)